The discography of Mexican singer Julieta Venegas consists of eight studio albums, one live album, one compilation album, and 16 singles. Venegas' breakthrough came in 2003 with the song "Andar Conmigo", from the album Sí, which reached number-one in the Mexican Singles Chart. The following year, she reached #4 in the Billboard Hot Latin Songs chart with "Algo Está Cambiando". In 2006, she released the critically acclaimed Grammy Award-winning Limón y Sal for Best Latin Pop Album, which spanned the hits "Me Voy" and "Eres Para Mí". In 2008, her first live album, MTV Unplugged, peaked at #162 on the Billboard 200 chart. In 2010, she released her fifth studio release entitled "Otra Cosa" a week achieved a gold record for high sales and as a first single launches "Bien o Mal."

Albums

Studio albums

Compilations

Live albums

Singles

1990s

2000s

2010s

2020s

As featured artist

Promotional singles

Videography

Video albums

Music videos

Soundtracks 

Todo El Poder (1999)
 Tracks: Chikero Bombay (Liquits featuring Julieta Venegas)

Amores Perros (2000)
 Track: Amores Perros (Me Van A Matar)

Sin Vergüenza (2001)
 Track: Fé

En el País de No Pasa Nada (2001)
 Tracks: Ay, Mala Leche and Lo Que Pedí

Perfume de Violetas (2001)
 Tracks: La Espera (Sr. González featuring Julieta Venegas)

Demasiado Amor (2001)
 Tracks: Acaríciame (Versión Mastretta) and Acaríciame (Versión Joan Valent)

El Sueño del Caimán (2002)
 Tracks: El Sueño del Caimán (Mastretta featuring Julieta Venegas)

Asesino En Serio (2002)
 Track: El Listón de Tu Pelo (Pau Donés featuring Julieta Venegas)

Subterra (2003)
 Track: Lo Que Tú Me Das (Julieta Venegas featuring Anita Tijoux)

Maria Full of Grace (2004)
 Track: Lo Que Venga Después

Sólo Dios Sabe (2005)
 Track: Saudade (Julieta Venegas featuring Otto) and Lágrimas Negras

The Heartbreak Kid (2007)
 Track: Canciones De Amor

Quemar Las Naves (2008)
 Tracks: Mi Principio, Miel Con Veneno and No Somos de Aquí

Abel (2010)
 Track: Abel

Una Noche En el Viejo México (2014)
 Track: Aquí Sigo

Elvira, te daría mi vida pero la estoy usando (2015)
 Track: Suavecito

References

Latin pop music discographies
Discographies of Mexican artists
Alternative rock discographies